The 1959 Columbia Lions football team was an American football team that represented Columbia University during the 1958 NCAA University Division football season. Columbia finished last in the Ivy League. 

In their third season under head coach Aldo "Buff" Donelli, the Lions compiled a 2–7 record and were outscored 210 to 82. Harvey Brookins was the team captain.  

The Lions' 1–6 conference record placed eighth in the Ivy League. Columbia was outscored 139 to 56 by Ivy opponents. 

Columbia played its home games at Baker Field in Upper Manhattan, in New York City.

Schedule

References

Columbia
Columbia Lions football seasons
Columbia Lions football